Kevin Krawietz and Albano Olivetti were the defending champions but chose not to defend their title.

Jonathan Eysseric and Quentin Halys won the title after defeating Julian Ocleppo and Andrea Vavassori 6–7(3–7), 6–4, [12–10] in the final.

Seeds

Draw

References
 Main Draw

Guzzini Challenger - Doubles
2017 Doubles